Maples is a historic building located near Middletown, New Castle County, Delaware.  It was built about 1855, and is a two-story, "L"-shaped, frame dwelling.  It is in the Delaware vernacular style with Greek Revival and Beaux Arts style details.  The building has a wraparound porch with flat roof, a cross-gable roof, and interior end chimneys.

It was listed on the National Register of Historic Places in 1978.

References

Houses on the National Register of Historic Places in Delaware
Beaux-Arts architecture in Delaware
Houses completed in 1855
Houses in New Castle County, Delaware
National Register of Historic Places in New Castle County, Delaware